Ferdowsiyeh (also Romanized as Ferdowsīyeh; also known as Ferdowsiyeh Hoomeh, Ferdowsīyeh-ye Āzādegān, Ferdowsīyeh-ye Ḩasan Zādeh, and Ferdowsīyeh-ye Rafī’ī) is a village in Azadegan Rural District, in the Central District of Rafsanjan County, Kerman Province, Iran. At the 2006 census, its population was 1,525, in 384 families.

References 

Populated places in Rafsanjan County